Indian Creek is a tributary of the Guyandotte River,  long, in southern West Virginia in the United States.

Indian Creek's entire course and drainage area are in southern Wyoming County. A section of the creek's middle course is paralleled by West Virginia Route 16.

According to the West Virginia Department of Environmental Protection, approximately 97.7% of the Indian Creek watershed is forested, mostly deciduous.

See also
List of rivers of West Virginia

References 

Rivers of West Virginia
Tributaries of the Guyandotte River
Rivers of Wyoming County, West Virginia